Bertien van Manen (born 1942) is a Dutch photographer. She started her career as a fashion photographer, after having studied French and German languages and literature. Inspired by Robert Frank's The Americans she travelled around, photographing what she saw. She had her first exhibition in The Photographers' Gallery in London in 1977 and since then her work has been exhibited in the Museum of Modern Art, New York, the Maison Européenne de la Photographie in Paris, the Stedelijk Museum Amsterdam and the Fotomuseum Winterthur. Van Manen's work is found in major public collections.

Life and work
Bertien van Manen started her photography career in 1974 as a fashion photographer after studying French language and literature at the University of Leiden.

Inspired by Robert Frank's book The Americans (1958), van Manen switched from fashion photography to a more documentary approach, she travelled around, photographing what she saw. She uses an inexpensive snapshot camera to take photos of people she meets, as she feels that these cameras allow her subjects to consider "me as a tourist or friend, who likes to take pictures." She has photographed extensively in China, the Appalachian Mountains in the US and the former Soviet Union.

She worked on commission and for long running projects, such as A Hundred Summers, A Hundred Winters (1991) about the post-Soviet states, East Wind, West Wind (2001) about China, Give me your Image (2006) about Europe, Moonshine (2014) with photographs of mining families in the Appalachian Mountains, and Beyond Maps and Atlases (2016) from Ireland.

In 2011 Let's Sit Down Before We Go was published by MACK, edited by Stephen Gill. 
In 2017 I Will be Wolf was published by MACK, edited by Stephen Gill.

Publications
A Hundred Summers, A Hundred Winters. Amsterdam: De Verbeelding, 1994. 
 East Wind West Wind. Amsterdam: De Verbeelding, 2001. 
In Moldova. Aorta Chisinau, 2005.
Give me your Image. Göttingen: Steidl, 2006. 
Let's Sit Down Before we go. London: Mack, 2011.Edited by Stephen Gill.
Easter and Oak Trees. London: Mack, 2013.
Moonshine. London: Mack, 2014. 
Beyond Maps and Atlases. London: Mack, 2016. . 
I Will be Wolf. London: Mack, 2017. Edited by Stephen Gill. .

Exhibitions
The Photographers' Gallery, London, 1977
Museum of Modern Art, New York
Maison européenne de la photographie, Paris
Stedelijk Museum Amsterdam
Fotomuseum Winterthur

Collections
Van Manen's work is held in the following public collections:
 Rijksmuseum, Amsterdam
  FOMU - Fotomuseum Antwerpen, 
 Maison européenne de la photographie, Paris,
 Fotomuseum Winterthur, Winterthur, Switzerland
 Stedelijk Museum Amsterdam, Amsterdam
 Museum of Modern Art, New York
 Metropolitan Museum of Art, New York
 San Francisco Museum of Modern Art, San Francisco
 Centre national des arts plastiques, Paris
 Tokyo Metropolitan Museum of Photography, Tokyo
 Baltimore Museum of Art, Baltimore, MD

References

External links 
 

Dutch women photographers
Dutch contemporary artists
1942 births
Living people
Photographers from The Hague